Leonardo Heras Aripez (born May 29, 1990) is a Mexican professional baseball outfielder for the Olmecas de Tabasco of the Mexican League.

Career
Heras began his career in 2007 with the Potros de Tijuana of the Mexican League. He played in 89 games for the club across two seasons before signing with the Broncos de Reynosa for the 2009 season. Heras hit .330 with 46 RBI in 2009 with Reynosa, and .316 with 55 RBI in 2010 before electing free agency. On March 11, 2011, Heras signed with the Diablos Rojos del México. He hit .342/.399/.536 in 102 games for Mexico in 2011, and in 112 games in 2012, he slashed .323/.398/.556 with a career-high 24 home runs. On February 15, 2013, Heras signed a minor league contract with the San Diego Padres organization, but quickly returned to the Diablos on March 20.

On August 13, 2013, Heras and Japhet Amador were traded to the Houston Astros organization and he reported to the Corpus Christi Hooks of the Class AA Texas League. He was invited to Spring Training for the 2014 season but did not make the club and was assigned to Double-A to begin the season. Heras spent the year in Corpus Christi, slashing .236/.354/.364 in 96 contests. The next year, Heras split the season between Corpus Christi and the Triple-A Fresno Grizzlies, batting a combined .239/.325/.362 with 5 home runs in 86 games. He played in an exhibition game in Mexico in 2016. After beginning the season with Fresno, Heras was loaned to the Diablos Rojos del México, where he finished the year.

The Astros released Heras after the 2016 season, and he signed with the Leones de Yucatán of the Mexican League. He batted .293/.363/.434 in 95 games for Yucatán in 2017. After the season on December 13, Heras was traded to the Acereros de Monclova, who traded him back to the Leones on February 12, 2018. He hit 9 home runs with the club in 2018 and batted .278/.394/.479 in 102 games in 2019.
Heras did not play in a game in 2020 due to the cancellation of the Mexican League season because of the COVID-19 pandemic. On February 23, 2021, Heras was traded to the Mariachis de Guadalajara of the Mexican League.

On August 1, 2022, Heras was traded to the Olmecas de Tabasco of the Mexican League in exchange for P Ricardo Green.

References

External links

1990 births
Living people
Algodoneros de Guasave players
Baseball players from Baja California
Broncos de Reynosa players
Charros de Jalisco players
Corpus Christi Hooks players
Diablos Rojos del México players
Fresno Grizzlies players
Leones de Yucatán players
Mariachis de Guadalajara players
Mexican expatriate baseball players in the United States
Mexican League baseball outfielders
Mexican League baseball second basemen
Sportspeople from Tijuana
Potros de Tijuana players
Yaquis de Obregón players